Sophie Farkas Bolla is a Canadian film editor. She is most noted for her work on the films P.S. Jerusalem, for which she was a Prix Iris nominee for Best Editing in a Documentary at the 18th Quebec Cinema Awards in 2018, and The Gig Is Up, for which she was a Canadian Screen Award nominee for Best Editing in a Documentary at the 10th Canadian Screen Awards in 2022.

Her other editing credits have included the films Antoine, Angry Inuk, Roads in February (Les Routes en février) and Beans.

She has also directed the short films Les chroniques de l'autre (2009), Istvan et la truite à fourrure (2013) and When Monsters Were Real (2016)

References

External links

Canadian film editors
Canadian women film editors
Canadian women film directors
Film directors from Quebec
Living people
Year of birth missing (living people)